King's Hill Historic District, located in southwest Portland, Oregon, is listed on the National Register of Historic Places.

See also
 Kings Hill / Southwest Salmon - station on the MAX Light Rail system
 National Register of Historic Places listings in Southwest Portland, Oregon
 Goose Hollow, Portland, Oregon

References

External links
 King's Hill Historic District Guidelines (PDF). 2001. Planning Bureau, City of Portland.

1991 establishments in Oregon
Goose Hollow, Portland, Oregon
Historic districts on the National Register of Historic Places in Oregon
National Register of Historic Places in Portland, Oregon
Victorian architecture in Oregon